Fillmore station is an at-grade light rail station on the L Line of the Los Angeles Metro Rail system. It is located on Fillmore Street, after which the station is named, between Raymond Avenue and Arroyo Parkway in Pasadena, California. The station opened on July 26, 2003, as part of the original Gold Line, then known as the "Pasadena Metro Blue Line" project. This station and all the other original and Foothill Extension stations will be part of the A Line upon completion of the Regional Connector project in 2023.

This station features station art called Geologica 42, created by artist Michael C. McMillen. Platform seating was designed in the form of steamer trunks.  The station has a parking lot with both free (first-come, first-served) and reserved paid parking.

Service

Station layout

Hours and frequency

Connections 
, the following connections are available:
 Pasadena Transit: 20, 51, 52
 ArtCenter College of Design Shuttle

Nearby landmarks
 Art Center College of Design South Campus
 Huntington Hospital
 Rose Palace

See also
 Los Angeles County Metro Rail
 Los Angeles County Metropolitan Transportation Authority
 Los Angeles Metro Rail rolling stock

References

External links

 Station home page

L Line (Los Angeles Metro) stations
Transportation in Pasadena, California
Railway stations in the United States opened in 2003